Pociej is a surname. Notable people with this surname include:

 Aleksander Pociej (born 1965), Polish politician
 Bohdan Pociej (1933–2011), Polish musicologist
 Hypatius Pociej (1541–1613), Metropolitan of Kiev
 Ludwik Pociej (1664–1730), Polish nobleman

See also
 

Polish-language surnames